Dan Smith (born October 19, 1976) is a Canadian former professional ice hockey defenceman who played primarily in the American Hockey League (AHL), he also played 22 games in the National Hockey League with the Colorado Avalanche and the Edmonton Oilers between 1998 and 2005.

Playing career 
Smith was selected 181st overall in the 1995 NHL Entry Draft, by the Colorado Avalanche. After completing his junior career with the Tri-City Americans of the WHL, Smith made his professional debut with the Hershey Bears, Colorado's AHL farm team.  During his five years with the Colorado, Smith played only 15 games for Avalanche, with the bulk of his time being spent with the Bears.

After a year playing in Finland, and another year in the Phoenix Coyotes organization (playing for the AHL Springfield Falcons), Smith signed with the Edmonton Oilers on  August 21, 2003.

In the three years Smith was part of the Oilers organization, he played nearly all the time with Edmonton's respective AHL affiliate. He collected another seven games during the 2005–06 season with the big club.

On July 13, 2006, Smith was signed by the Detroit Red Wings. After the Red Wings training camp, Smith was assigned to Detroit's AHL affiliate, the Grand Rapids Griffins, with whom he played the 2006–07 season.

For the 2007–08 season, on July 11, 2007, Smith was signed by the Columbus Blue Jackets. Added as depth for their affiliate, the Syracuse Crunch, Smith's veteran presence helped guide the Crunch to the second round of the playoffs. Smith re-signed on July 8, 2008, with the Crunch for the following 2008–09 season. Named captain, the tenth in Syracuse history, Smith missed only one game in the year as the Crunch failed to qualify for the playoffs.

Smith retired on December 10, 2009.

Career statistics

Transactions 
July 8, 1995 - Smith drafted by Colorado Avalanche
August 8, 2002 - Smith signs with Phoenix Coyotes
August 21, 2003 - Smith signs with Edmonton Oilers
July 13, 2006 - Smith signs with Detroit Red Wings
July 11, 2007 - Smith signs with Columbus Blue Jackets

References

External links 
 

1976 births
Living people
Canadian expatriate ice hockey players in Finland
Canadian ice hockey defencemen
Colorado Avalanche draft picks
Colorado Avalanche players
Colorado Gold Kings players
Edmonton Oilers players
Grand Rapids Griffins players
Hershey Bears players
Ice hockey people from British Columbia
Lukko players
People from Fernie, British Columbia
Springfield Falcons players
Syracuse Crunch players
Toronto Roadrunners players
Tri-City Americans players